The 1992–93 NBA season was the Bulls' 27th season in the National Basketball Association. The Bulls entered the season as the back-to-back defending NBA champions, having defeated the Portland Trail Blazers in the 1992 NBA Finals in six games, winning their second NBA championship. In the off-season, the team acquired Rodney McCray from the Dallas Mavericks, and signed free agent Trent Tucker. At midseason, the team signed Darrell Walker, who was previously released by the Detroit Pistons. After two straight championships, the Bulls would make changes to their lineup, replacing John Paxson at point guard with B. J. Armstrong after Paxson went down with a knee injury, and only played 59 games. The team won nine of their first eleven games, and posted a 7-game winning streak between December and January, holding a 35–17 record at the All-Star break. The Bulls posted another 7-game winning streak between February and March, and would yet again have another successful season finishing in first place in the Central Division, and second overall in the Eastern Conference with a 57–25 record. They also advanced to the Eastern Conference Finals for the fifth consecutive season, becoming the first team since the 1987–88 Boston Celtics to do so.

Michael Jordan once again led the league in scoring with 32.6 points per game, plus averaging 6.7 rebounds, 5.5 assists and 2.8 steals per game, and was named to the All-NBA First Team, while Scottie Pippen averaged 18.6 points, 7.7 rebounds, 6.3 assists and 2.1 steals per game, and was named to the All-NBA Third Team. Both players were selected to the NBA All-Defensive First Team, and selected for the 1993 NBA All-Star Game. In addition, Horace Grant averaged 13.2 points, 9.5 rebounds and 1.2 blocks per game, and was named to the NBA All-Defensive Second Team, while Armstrong provided the team with 12.3 points per game. Jordan also finished in third place in Most Valuable Player voting, and tied in second place in Defensive Player of the Year voting.

In the Eastern Conference First Round of the playoffs, the Bulls swept the Atlanta Hawks in three straight games. In the Eastern Conference Semi-finals, they swept the Cleveland Cavaliers in four straight games. Then after losing the first two games of the Eastern Conference Finals to the top-seeded New York Knicks, the Bulls would win the next four games of the series. Then they would then go on to win their third consecutive NBA championship, defeating regular season MVP Charles Barkley and the Phoenix Suns in six games in the 1993 NBA Finals. This was the last title the Bulls won while playing at Chicago Stadium.

Chicago's off-season was also marked by Jordan's sudden retirement. Also following the season, McCray, Tucker, and Walker were all released to free agency. For the season, the Bulls slightly changed their uniforms, which remained in used until 2004, when they added their secondary logo on the back of their jerseys.

Offseason

NBA Draft

Roster

Regular season

Season standings

Record vs. opponents

Game log

Regular season

|-style="background:#cfc;"
| 1
| November 6, 1992
| @ Cleveland
| W 101–96
| Michael Jordan (29)
| Horace Grant (15)
| Scottie Pippen (10)
| Richfield Coliseum20,273
| 1–0
|-style="background:#fcc;"
| 2
| November 7, 1992
| Atlanta
| L 99–100
| Michael Jordan (35)
| Horace Grant (11)
| Michael Jordan (11)
| Chicago Stadium18,676
| 1–1
|-style="background:#cfc;"
| 3
| November 9, 1992
| Indiana
| W 102–87
| Michael Jordan (24)
| Scottie Pippen (13)
| Michael Jordan (12)
| Chicago Stadium18,084
| 2–1
|-style="background:#cfc;"
| 4
| November 11, 1992
| Detroit
| W 98–96 (OT)
| Michael Jordan (37)
| Horace Grant (14)
| Scottie Pippen (10)
| Chicago Stadium18,676
| 3–1
|-style="background:#cfc;"
| 5
| November 13, 1992
| @ Milwaukee
| W 101–96
| Michael Jordan (34)
| Scottie Pippen (13)
| Scottie Pippen (8)
| Bradley Center18,633
| 4–1
|-style="background:#cfc;"
| 6
| November 14, 1992
| Denver
| W 117–84
| Michael Jordan (18)
| Will Perdue (13)
| Michael Jordan (7)
| Chicago Stadium18,676
| 5–1
|-style="background:#cfc;"
| 7
| November 17, 1992
| @ Minnesota
| W 124–103
| Michael Jordan (32)
| Scott Williams (6)
| Scottie Pippen (12)
| Target Center19,006
| 6–1
|-style="background:#cfc;"
| 8
| November 19, 1992
| @ Seattle
| W 108–99
| Michael Jordan (35)
| Pippen & Williams (9)
| Scottie Pippen (8)
| Kingdome37,401
| 7–1
|-style="background:#fcc;"
| 9
| November 20, 1992
| @ L.A. Lakers
| L 118–120 (OT)
| Michael Jordan (54)
| Horace Grant (14)
| Grant & Jordan (7)
| Great Western Forum17,505
| 7–2
|-style="background:#cfc;"
| 10
| November 22, 1992
| @ Phoenix
| W 128–111
| Michael Jordan (40)
| Grant & King (8)
| B. J. Armstrong (9)
| America West Arena19,023
| 8–2
|-style="background:#cfc;"
| 11
| November 24, 1992
| @ Golden State
| W 101–92
| Michael Jordan (49)
| Horace Grant (17)
| Jordan & Pippen (7)
| Oakland-Alameda County Coliseum Arena15,025
| 9–2
|-style="background:#fcc;"
| 12
| November 28, 1992
| @ New York
| L 75–112
| Michael Jordan (17)
| Grant & Pippen (7)
| Jordan & Pippen (4)
| Madison Square Garden19,763
| 9–3

|-style="background:#fcc;"
| 13
| December 2, 1992
| @ Boston
| L 96–101
| Horace Grant (20)
| Horace Grant (11)
| Scottie Pippen (10)
| Boston Garden14,890
| 9–4
|-style="background:#cfc;"
| 14
| December 4, 1992
| Portland
| W 111–99
| Michael Jordan (38)
| Michael Jordan (13)
| Scottie Pippen (9)
| Chicago Stadium18,676
| 10–4
|-style="background:#cfc;"
| 15
| December 5, 1992
| Boston
| W 96–89
| Michael Jordan (24)
| Horace Grant (10)
| Scottie Pippen (11)
| Chicago Stadium18,676
| 11–4
|-style="background:#fcc;"
| 16
| December 8, 1992
| @ Atlanta
| L 114–123
| Michael Jordan (32)
| Michael Jordan (12)
| Michael Jordan (8)
| The Omni16,441
| 11–5
|-style="background:#cfc;"
| 17
| December 9, 1992
| Cleveland
| W 108–91
| Michael Jordan (28)
| Horace Grant (15)
| Scottie Pippen (11)
| Chicago Stadium18,142
| 12–5
|-style="background:#fcc;"
| 18
| December 11, 1992
| Houston
| L 96–110
| Michael Jordan (26)
| Michael Jordan (11)
| Scottie Pippen (8)
| Chicago Stadium18,147
| 12–6
|-style="background:#cfc;"
| 19
| December 12, 1992
| New Jersey
| W 95–89
| Michael Jordan (38)
| Horace Grant (11)
| Scottie Pippen (7)
| Chicago Stadium18,232
| 13–6
|-style="background:#cfc;"
| 20
| December 15, 1992
| Charlotte
| W 125–110
| Scottie Pippen (26)
| Scottie Pippen (9)
| Scottie Pippen (10)
| Chicago Stadium18,088
| 14–6
|-style="background:#cfc;"
| 21
| December 17, 1992
| @ Washington
| W 107–99
| Michael Jordan (28)
| Scottie Pippen (13)
| Michael Jordan (8)
| Capital Centre18,756
| 15–6
|-style="background:#fcc;"
| 22
| December 19, 1992
| Philadelphia
| L 96–98
| Michael Jordan (23)
| Horace Grant (11)
| Michael Jordan (10)
| Chicago Stadium18,270
| 15–7
|-style="background:#cfc;"
| 23
| December 21, 1992
| Miami
| W 86–82
| Scottie Pippen (22)
| Michael Jordan (8)
| 3 players tied (4)
| Chicago Stadium18,147
| 16–7
|-style="background:#cfc;"
| 24
| December 23, 1992
| Washington
| W 107–98
| Michael Jordan (57)
| Horace Grant (16)
| Michael Jordan (10)
| Chicago Stadium18,109
| 17–7
|-style="background:#cfc;"
| 25
| December 25, 1992
| New York
| W 89–77
| Michael Jordan (42)
| Scottie Pippen (9)
| Jordan & Pippen (5)
| Chicago Stadium18,676
| 18–7
|-style="background:#cfc;"
| 26
| December 26, 1992
| @ Indiana
| W 95–84
| Horace Grant (30)
| Horace Grant (20)
| Michael Jordan (8)
| Market Square Arena16,530
| 19–7
|-style="background:#cfc;"
| 27
| December 29, 1992
| @ Charlotte
| W 114–103
| Michael Jordan (28)
| Michael Jordan (12)
| Michael Jordan (11)
| Charlotte Coliseum23,698
| 20–7
|-style="background:#cfc;"
| 28
| December 30, 1992
| @ Miami
| W 105–100
| Michael Jordan (39)
| Horace Grant (9)
| Jordan & Pippen (8)
| Miami Arena15,008
| 21–7

|-style="background:#cfc;"
| 29
| January 2, 1993
| Indiana
| W 109–100
| Michael Jordan (39)
| Horace Grant (16)
| Scottie Pippen (7)
| Chicago Stadium18,676
| 22–7
|-style="background:#fcc;"
| 30
| January 5, 1993
| L.A. Lakers
| L 88–91
| Michael Jordan (36)
| Cartwright & Pippen (7)
| Michael Jordan (5)
| Chicago Stadium18,676
| 22–8
|-style="background:#fcc;"
| 31
| January 6, 1993
| @ Cleveland
| L 95–117
| Scottie Pippen (24)
| Scottie Pippen (9)
| Michael Jordan (3)
| Richfield Coliseum20,273
| 22–9
|-style="background:#cfc;"
| 32
| January 8, 1993
| Milwaukee Bucks
| W 120–95
| Michael Jordan (35)
| Will Perdue (13)
| Scottie Pippen (12)
| Chicago Stadium18,676
| 23–9
|-style="background:#fcc;"
| 33
| January 9, 1993
| @ Philadelphia
| L 91–104
| Michael Jordan (30)
| Scottie Pippen (12)
| Michael Jordan (6)
| The Spectrum18,168
| 23–10
|-style="background:#cfc;"
| 34
| January 12, 1993
| @ Orlando
| W 122–106
| Horace Grant (26)
| Scottie Pippen (10)
| Scottie Pippen (10)
| Orlando Arena15,151
| 24–10
|-style="background:#cfc;"
| 35
| January 15, 1993
| Golden State
| W 122–101
| Michael Jordan (26)
| Michael Jordan (12)
| Michael Jordan (10)
| Chicago Stadium18,676
| 25–10
|-style="background:#fcc;"
| 36
| January 16, 1993
| Orlando
| L 124–128 (OT)
| Michael Jordan (64)
| Horace Grant (19)
| Scottie Pippen (8)
| Chicago Stadium18,676
| 25–11
|-style="background:#cfc;"
| 37
| January 18, 1993
| Boston
| W 103–93
| Michael Jordan (29)
| Horace Grant (12)
| Scottie Pippen (8)
| Chicago Stadium18,676
| 26–11
|-style="background:#cfc;"
| 38
| January 21, 1993
| @ New Jersey
| W 107–94
| Michael Jordan (30)
| Horace Grant (12)
| Scottie Pippen (8)
| Brendan Byrne Arena20,049
| 27–11
|-style="background:#fcc;"
| 39
| January 22, 1993
| Charlotte
| L 97–105
| Michael Jordan (28)
| Horace Grant (13)
| Armstrong & Pippen (5)
| Chicago Stadium18,676
| 27–12
|-style="background:#fcc;"
| 40
| January 24, 1993
| @ San Antonio
| L 99–103
| Michael Jordan (42)
| Michael Jordan (11)
| Scottie Pippen (6)
| HemisFair Arena16,057
| 27–13
|-style="background:#cfc;"
| 41
| January 26, 1993
| @ Dallas
| W 123–88
| King & Pippen (19)
| King & Pippen (11)
| Scottie Pippen (7)
| Reunion Arena17,502
| 28–13
|-style="background:#fcc;"
| 42
| January 28, 1993
| @ Houston
| L 83–94
| Michael Jordan (26)
| Scottie Pippen (8)
| Scottie Pippen (7)
| The Summit16,611
| 28–14
|-style="background:#fcc;"
| 43
| January 30, 1993
| @ Denver
| L 102–109
| Michael Jordan (39)
| Scott Williams (14)
| B. J. Armstrong (6)
| McNichols Sports Arena17,022
| 28–15

|-style="background:#cfc;"
| 44
| February 1, 1993
| @ Utah
| W 96–92
| Michael Jordan (37)
| Horace Grant (19)
| B. J. Armstrong (4)
| Delta Center19,911
| 29–15
|-style="background:#cfc;"
| 45
| February 3, 1993
| @ Sacramento
| W 107–88
| Michael Jordan (36)
| Horace Grant (11)
| Scottie Pippen (9)
| ARCO Arena17,317
| 30–15
|-style="background:#cfc;"
| 46
| February 4, 1993
| @ L.A. Clippers
| W 107–105 (OT)
| Michael Jordan (33)
| Horace Grant (14)
| 3 players tied (4)
| Los Angeles Memorial Sports Arena15,989
| 31–15
|-style="background:#cfc;"
| 47
| February 7, 1993
| @ Portland
| W 101–91
| Michael Jordan (34)
| Horace Grant (13)
| Scottie Pippen (7)
| Memorial Coliseum12,888
| 32–15
|-style="background:#cfc;"
| 48
| February 10, 1993
| @ Indiana
| W 115–104
| Michael Jordan (40)
| Horace Grant (14)
| Michael Jordan (8)
| Market Square Arena16,530
| 33–15
|-style="background:#fcc;"
| 49
| February 12, 1993
| New York
| L 98–104
| Scottie Pippen (35)
| Horace Grant (12)
| Trent Tucker (6)
| Chicago Stadium18,676
| 33–16
|-style="background:#fcc;"
| 50
| February 13, 1993
| Cleveland
| L 111–116
| Jordan & Pippen (25)
| Grant & Perdue (8)
| 3 players tied (5)
| Chicago Stadium18,676
| 33–17
|-style="background:#cfc;"
| 51
| February 15, 1993
| Sacramento
| W 119–101
| Michael Jordan (32)
| Scott Williams (12)
| Michael Jordan (6)
| Chicago Stadium18,237
| 34–17
|-style="background:#cfc;"
| 52
| February 17, 1993
| Utah
| W 114–96
| Michael Jordan (27)
| Horace Grant (9)
| Scottie Pippen (7)
| Chicago Stadium18,676
| 35–17
|- align="center"
|colspan="9" bgcolor="#bbcaff"|All-Star Break
|- style="background:#cfc;"
|- bgcolor="#bbffbb"
|-style="background:#cfc;"
| 53
| February 23, 1993
| Milwaukee
| W 99–95
| Michael Jordan (34)
| Horace Grant (13)
| Scottie Pippen (9)
| Chicago Stadium18,197
| 36–17
|-style="background:#cfc;"
| 54
| February 25, 1993
| @ Orlando
| W 108–106
| Michael Jordan (36)
| Grant & Perdue (9)
| Scottie Pippen (7)
| Orlando Arena15,151
| 37–17
|-style="background:#cfc;"
| 55
| February 27, 1993
| Atlanta
| W 112–92
| Michael Jordan (34)
| Scott Williams (11)
| Armstrong & Jordan (8)
| Chicago Stadium18,676
| 38–17

|-style="background:#cfc;"
| 56
| March 2, 1993
| @ New Jersey
| W 87–80
| Michael Jordan (24)
| Horace Grant (11)
| Michael Jordan (8)
| Brendan Byrne Arena20,049
| 39–17
|-style="background:#cfc;"
| 57
| March 3, 1993
| Dallas
| W 125–97
| Scottie Pippen (24)
| Scott Williams (8)
| Trent Tucker (8)
| Chicago Stadium18,062
| 40–17
|-style="background:#fcc;"
| 58
| March 5, 1993
| San Antonio
| L 102–107 (OT)
| Scottie Pippen (39)
| Scottie Pippen (13)
| Scottie Pippen (10)
| Chicago Stadium18,676
| 40–18
|-style="background:#cfc;"
| 59
| March 9, 1993
| Seattle
| W 86–83
| Michael Jordan (38)
| Scottie Pippen (12)
| Michael Jordan (9)
| Chicago Stadium18,531
| 41–18
|-style="background:#fcc;"
| 60
| March 11, 1993
| @ Miami
| L 95–97
| Michael Jordan (29)
| Scott Williams (9)
| Michael Jordan (8)
| Miami Arena15,008
| 41–19
|-style="background:#cfc;"
| 61
| March 12, 1993
| Charlotte
| W 123–108
| Michael Jordan (52)
| Will Perdue (10)
| B. J. Armstrong (7)
| Chicago Stadium18,676
| 42–19
|-style="background:#fcc;"
| 62
| March 14, 1993
| @ Detroit
| L 99–101
| Michael Jordan (28)
| Scott Williams (10)
| Jordan & Pippen (6)
| The Palace of Auburn Hills21,454
| 42–20
|-style="background:#cfc;"
| 63
| March 15, 1993
| L.A. Clippers
| W 101–94
| B. J. Armstrong (28)
| Horace Grant (17)
| B. J. Armstrong (7)
| Chicago Stadium18,482
| 43–20
|-style="background:#cfc;"
| 64
| March 19, 1993
| Washington
| W 104–99
| Michael Jordan (25)
| Will Perdue (12)
| Scottie Pippen (7)
| Chicago Stadium18,676
| 44–20
|-style="background:#cfc;"
| 65
| March 20, 1993
| @ Washington
| W 126–101
| Michael Jordan (47)
| Michael Jordan (8)
| Armstrong & Jordan (4)
| Capital Centre18,756
| 45–20
|-style="background:#cfc;"
| 66
| March 23, 1993
| Minnesota
| W 107–100
| Michael Jordan (34)
| Scott Williams (13)
| Michael Jordan (7)
| Chicago Stadium18,676
| 46–20
|-style="background:#cfc;"
| 67
| March 24, 1993
| @ Philadelphia
| W 113–100
| Michael Jordan (43)
| Scottie Pippen (10)
| Scottie Pippen (8)
| The Spectrum18,168
| 47–20
|-style="background:#cfc;"
| 68
| March 26, 1993
| Orlando
| W 107–86
| Scottie Pippen (20)
| Scottie Pippen (13)
| Scottie Pippen (8)
| Chicago Stadium18,676
| 48–20
|-style="background:#fcc;"
| 69
| March 30, 1993
| Phoenix
| L 109–113
| Michael Jordan (44)
| Horace Grant (16)
| Scottie Pippen (10)
| Chicago Stadium18,676
| 48–21

|-style="background:#cfc;"
| 70
| April 2, 1993
| New Jersey
| W 118–105
| Michael Jordan (40)
| Horace Grant (11)
| Scottie Pippen (8)
| Chicago Stadium18,676
| 49–21
|-style="background:#cfc;"
| 71
| April 4, 1993
| @ Boston
| W 101–89
| Michael Jordan (32)
| Scottie Pippen (9)
| Armstrong & Grant (4)
| Boston Garden14,890
| 50–21
|-style="background:#fcc;"
| 72
| April 6, 1993
| @ Milwaukee
| L 109–113
| Michael Jordan (30)
| Scottie Pippen (11)
| Scottie Pippen (8)
| Bradley Center18,633
| 50–22
|-style="background:#cfc;"
| 73
| April 9, 1993
| @ Atlanta
| W 88–87
| Michael Jordan (30)
| Michael Jordan (12)
| Armstrong & Jordan (4)
| The Omni16,510
| 51–22
|-style="background:#cfc;"
| 74
| April 10, 1993
| @ Indiana
| W 92–87
| B. J. Armstrong (27)
| Horace Grant (14)
| 3 players tied (5)
| Market Square Arena16,530
| 52–22
|-style="background:#cfc;"
| 75
| April 12, 1993
| @ Detroit
| W 98–95
| Michael Jordan (23)
| Horace Grant (11)
| Horace Grant (7)
| The Palace of Auburn Hills21,454
| 53–22
|-style="background:#cfc;"
| 76
| April 14, 1993
| Miami
| W 119–92
| Michael Jordan (34)
| Horace Grant (8)
| John Paxson (8)
| Chicago Stadium18,676
| 54–22
|-style="background:#cfc;"
| 77
| April 16, 1993
| Milwaukee
| W 119–105
| Michael Jordan (47)
| Jordan & Pippen (7)
| John Paxson (8)
| Chicago Stadium18,676
| 55–22
|-style="background:#fcc;"
| 78
| April 18, 1993
| @ Cleveland
| L 94–103
| Michael Jordan (32)
| Horace Grant (9)
| Michael Jordan (9)
| Richfield Coliseum20,273
| 55–23
|-style="background:#cfc;"
| 79
| April 20, 1993
| Philadelphia
| W 123–94
| Michael Jordan (28)
| Scott Williams (10)
| B. J. Armstrong (14)
| Chicago Stadium18,676
| 56–23
|-style="background:#cfc;"
| 80
| April 22, 1993
| Detroit
| W 109–103 (OT)
| Michael Jordan (36)
| Scottie Pippen (13)
| Scottie Pippen (8)
| Chicago Stadium18,676
| 57–23
|-style="background:#fcc;"
| 81
| April 23, 1993
| @ Charlotte
| L 103–104
| Michael Jordan (38)
| 4 players tied (6)
| Grant & Pippen (5)
| Charlotte Coliseum23,698
| 57–24
|-style="background:#fcc;"
| 82
| April 25, 1993
| @ New York
| L 84–89
| Michael Jordan (21)
| Scott Williams (9)
| Michael Jordan (7)
| Madison Square Garden19,763
| 57–25

Playoffs

|- align="center" bgcolor="#ccffcc"
| 1
| April 30, 1993
| Atlanta
| W 114–90
| Michael Jordan (35)
| Horace Grant (10)
| Trent Tucker (7)
| Chicago Stadium18,676
| 1–0
|- align="center" bgcolor="#ccffcc"
| 2
| May 2, 1993
| Atlanta
| W 117–102
| Michael Jordan (29)
| Horace Grant (8)
| John Paxson (7)
| Chicago Stadium18,676
| 2–0
|- align="center" bgcolor="#ccffcc"
| 3
| May 4, 1993
| @ Atlanta
| W 98–88
| Michael Jordan (39)
| Horace Grant (9)
| B. J. Armstrong (6)
| The Omni15,141
| 3–0

|- align="center" bgcolor="#ccffcc"
| 1
| May 11, 1993
| Cleveland
| W 91–84
| Michael Jordan (43)
| Cartwright & Williams (10)
| Jordan & Pippen (4)
| Chicago Stadium18,676
| 1–0
|- align="center" bgcolor="#ccffcc"
| 2
| May 13, 1993
| Cleveland
| W 104–85
| Horace Grant (20)
| Scott Williams (10)
| Scottie Pippen (7)
| Chicago Stadium18,676
| 2–0
|- align="center" bgcolor="#ccffcc"
| 3
| May 15, 1993
| @ Cleveland
| W 96–90
| Michael Jordan (32)
| Scottie Pippen (9)
| Scottie Pippen (6)
| Richfield Coliseum20,273
| 3–0
|- align="center" bgcolor="#ccffcc"
| 4
| May 17, 1993
| @ Cleveland
| W 103–101
| Michael Jordan (31)
| Horace Grant (10)
| Michael Jordan (6)
| Richfield Coliseum20,274
| 4–0

|- align="center" bgcolor="#ffcccc"
| 1
| May 23, 1993
| @ New York
| L 90–98
| Michael Jordan (27)
| Horace Grant (8)
| Michael Jordan (5)
| Madison Square Garden19,763
| 0–1
|- align="center" bgcolor="#ffcccc"
| 2
| May 25, 1993
| @ New York
| L 91–96
| Michael Jordan (36)
| Michael Jordan (9)
| Pippen & Williams (4)
| Madison Square Garden19,763
| 0–2
|- align="center" bgcolor="#ccffcc"
| 3
| May 29, 1993
| New York
| W 103–83
| Scottie Pippen (29)
| Michael Jordan (8)
| Michael Jordan (11)
| Chicago Stadium18,676
| 1–2
|- align="center" bgcolor="#ccffcc"
| 4
| May 31, 1993
| New York
| W 105–95
| Michael Jordan (54)
| Scottie Pippen (7)
| Scottie Pippen (4)
| Chicago Stadium18,676
| 2–2
|- align="center" bgcolor="#ccffcc"
| 5
| June 2, 1993
| @ New York
| W 97–94
| Michael Jordan (29)
| Scottie Pippen (11)
| Michael Jordan (14)
| Madison Square Garden19,763
| 3–2
|- align="center" bgcolor="#ccffcc"
| 6
| June 4, 1993
| New York
| W 96–88
| Michael Jordan (25)
| Horace Grant (11)
| Michael Jordan (9)
| Chicago Stadium18,676
| 4–2

|- align="center" bgcolor="#ccffcc"
| 1
| June 9, 1993
| @ Phoenix
| W 100–92
| Michael Jordan (31)
| Scott Williams (10)
| 4 players tied (5)
| America West Arena19,023
| 1–0
|- align="center" bgcolor="#ccffcc"
| 2
| June 11, 1993
| @ Phoenix
| W 111–108
| Michael Jordan (42)
| Jordan & Pippen (12)
| Scottie Pippen (12)
| America West Arena19,023
| 2–0
|- align="center" bgcolor="#ffcccc"
| 3
| June 13, 1993
| Phoenix
| L 121–129 (3OT)
| Michael Jordan (44)
| Horace Grant (17)
| Scottie Pippen (9)
| Chicago Stadium18,676
| 2–1
|- align="center" bgcolor="#ccffcc"
| 4
| June 16, 1993
| Phoenix
| W 111–105
| Michael Jordan (55)
| Horace Grant (16)
| Scottie Pippen (10)
| Chicago Stadium18,676
| 3–1
|- align="center" bgcolor="#ffcccc"
| 5
| June 18, 1993
| Phoenix
| L 98–108
| Michael Jordan (41)
| Grant & Jordan (7)
| Michael Jordan (7)
| Chicago Stadium18,676
| 3–2
|- align="center" bgcolor="#ccffcc"
| 6
| June 20, 1993
| @ Phoenix
| W 99–98
| Michael Jordan (33)
| Scottie Pippen (12)
| Michael Jordan (7)
| America West Arena19,023
| 4–2

Player stats

Regular season

Playoffs

NBA Finals

The 1993 NBA Finals was the championship round of the 1992–93 NBA season, featuring the Chicago Bulls, led by Michael Jordan, and the Phoenix Suns, winners of 62 games and led by regular season MVP Charles Barkley.  The Bulls became the first team since the legendary Boston Celtics of the 1960s to win three consecutive championship titles, clinching the "three-peat" with John Paxson's game-winning 3-pointer that gave them a 99–98 victory in Game 6. The road team won five of the six games, with Chicago winning at home in Game 4, 111–105.

 The Phoenix Suns won game 3 in 3OT, 129–121. Suns Head Coach Paul Westphal was the only person to appear in both triple-overtime NBA finals games. The first was the classic 1976 contest against Boston, in Game 5 as a player. His Suns also played in that year's finals, thus becoming the only team to appear in two triple-overtime finals games. Back in 1976, the Suns lost 126–128 against Boston.
 The Bulls got off to a good start in Game 6 but struggled in the fourth quarter, wasting a double-digit lead to trail 98–94.  Michael Jordan made a layup to cut the margin to 2 points, and the Suns missed a shot on their next possession.  Trailing 98–96 and facing a Game 7 on the road if they lost that day, John Paxson took a pass from Horace Grant and buried a three-point shot with 3.9 seconds left, giving the Bulls a 99–98 lead.  The victory was secured by a last-second block from Horace Grant.
 Michael Jordan, who averaged a Finals-record 41.0 points per game during the six-game series, became the first player in NBA history to win three straight Finals MVP Awards. He joined Magic Johnson as the only other player to win the award three times. The NBA started awarding the Finals MVP in 1969.

(W1) Phoenix Suns vs. (E2) Chicago Bulls: Bulls win series 4–2
 Game 1 @ America West Arena, Phoenix (June 9): Chicago 100, Phoenix 92
 Game 2 @ America West Arena, Phoenix (June 11): Chicago 111, Phoenix 108
 Game 3 @ Chicago Stadium, Chicago (June 13): Phoenix 129, Chicago 121 (3OT)
 Game 4 @ Chicago Stadium, Chicago (June 16): Chicago 111, Phoenix 105
 Game 5 @ Chicago Stadium, Chicago (June 18): Phoenix 108, Chicago 98
 Game 6 @ America West Arena, Phoenix (June 20): Chicago 99, Phoenix 98

1993 NBA Finals roster

1993 Chicago Bulls
Head Coach:Phil Jackson 
Michael Jordan     |
Scottie Pippen     |
Horace Grant       |
B. J. Armstrong      |
Scott Williams     |
Bill Cartwright    |
Stacey King        |
Trent Tucker       |
John Paxson        |
Will Perdue        |
Rodney McCray      |
Ricky Blanton      |
Darrell Walker     |
Corey Williams     |
Jo Jo English       |

1993 Phoenix Suns
Head Coach:Paul Westphal 
Charles Barkley    |
Dan Majerle        |
Kevin Johnson      |
Tom Chambers       |
Danny Ainge        |
Richard Dumas      |
Negele Knight      |
Oliver Miller      |
Mark West          |
Jerrod Mustaf      |
Frank Johnson      |
Tim Kempton        |

Award winners
 Michael Jordan, Associated Press Athlete of the Year
 Michael Jordan, All-NBA First Team
 Scottie Pippen, All-NBA Third Team
 Michael Jordan, NBA Finals Most Valuable Player Award
 Michael Jordan, NBA All-Defensive First Team
 Scottie Pippen, NBA All-Defensive First Team
 Horace Grant, NBA All-Defensive Second Team

NBA All-Star Game
 Michael Jordan, Guard
 Scottie Pippen, Forward

Transactions

References

 Bulls on Database Basketball
 Bulls on Basketball Reference

Chicago Bulls seasons
Eastern Conference (NBA) championship seasons
NBA championship seasons
Chicago Bulls
Chicago Bulls
Chicago Bulls